Cheshmeh Baklu (also Romanized as Cheshmeh Baklū; also known as Cheshmeh Baglū and Cheshmeh Bayglū) is a village in Sornabad Rural District, Hamaijan District, Sepidan County, Fars Province, Iran. At the 2006 census, its population was 135, in 34 families.

References 

Populated places in Sepidan County